Haakon Hansen may refer to:

Haakon Hansen (politician) (1907–1971), Norwegian politician
Haakon Hansen (boxer) (1907–1985), Norwegian boxer